Grantham Rovers Football Club was an English team located in Grantham, Lincolnshire that played in the Midland League from 1891 to 1897.

Grantham Rovers disbanded in 1897 after incurring debts of £140.

References

Association football clubs established in 1891
Sport in Grantham
Defunct football clubs in Lincolnshire
Midland Football League (1889)
Association football clubs disestablished in 1897